Western Colorado University (Western) is a public university in Gunnison, Colorado. It enrolls approximately 2,600 undergraduate and 400 graduate students, with 25 percent coming from out of state.

Western offers more than 100 undergraduate areas of study and seven graduate programs, five of which are available as accelerated degree programs. Since 2013, Western's student headcount has grown by 17.4%, the highest percentage increase in full-time enrollment in Colorado outside of the University of Colorado System.

History
Western was established in 1901 and opened for classes in 1911 as the Colorado State Normal School, the first college on the Western Slope. This initial focus as a preparatory college for teachers resulted in a commitment to teacher preparation programs that continues to this day. In 1923 the college's name was changed to Western State College of Colorado in recognition of its expanding programs in the liberal arts at both undergraduate and graduate levels. The college continued to grow, particularly after World War II when returning veterans attended on the GI Bill, and academic and co-curricular programs capitalizing on the college's unique mountain setting were continually added. In 2012, the institution was renamed Western State Colorado University. In September 2018, the institution changed its name to Western Colorado University.

Admissions 
Undergraduate admission at Western is a holistic process where students' academic history, leadership potential, diversity of experience, depth of participation in extracurricular activities and overall interest in attending are taken into account. Every student who applies is considered for a merit scholarship worth between $2,500-$4,500 per year (in-state) and $8,000-$10,000 (out-of-state) based on GPA and ACT/SAT scores.

Western accepted 95% of applicants for the class of 2022.

Academics 
Western offers more than 90 areas of study for undergraduates and seven graduate programs with class sizes averaging 18 students. Popular majors include Business Administration, Biology, Exercise & Sport Science, Environment & Sustainability, Recreation & Outdoor Education and Psychology. Western also offers many unique programs, including Petroleum Geology, Energy Management and High Altitude Exercise Physiology. By virtue of the school's mountainous setting, professors in many departments are known for taking their classes into the “outdoor laboratory” that surrounds campus.

Research 
The Biology and Exercise & Sport Science departments are actively involved in research. The Thornton Biology Research Program has funded undergraduate research projects for the past 30 years. The Master of Science in High Altitude Exercise Physiology program is constantly conducting research and frequently involves undergraduate students as well. Western's undergraduate Geology program offers research opportunities, scholarships and grants.

High Altitude Performance Laboratory 
The High Altitude Performance Lab (HAP Lab)—which sits at 7,750 feet above sea level—is a sport performance and exercise physiology facility equipped to assess the major fitness parameters. These parameters include: muscular endurance, muscular strength, cardiopulmonary capacity, flexibility and body composition. The primary goal of the lab is to provide well rounded, applied experiences to Western undergraduate Exercise & Sport Science majors.

Rankings and recognition 

U.S. News & World Report ranked Western in three categories for 2020: Regional Universities West, Top Performers in Social Mobility, and regional Top Public Schools.
Forbes designated Western Colorado University as one of the top 100 institutions in the West in 2017. Western has also appeared on Forbes lists in 2019, 2018, 2016, 2015 and 2014.
 Elevation Outdoors magazine named Western the "Top Adventure School in the West" for the third time in 2017.

Faculty 
Of Western's 171 faculty members, 75% are full-time. The majority of faculty at Western also carry a terminal degree.

In 2000, Biology professor Jessica Young helped discover the Gunnison Sage-Grouse. This was the first new avian species to be described in the United States since the 19th century. Young is currently the Global Coordinator for the School of Environment & Sustainability at Western.

Campus

University Center 
The University Center is a primary center for student life at Western. It is home to the Rare Air Cafe and Mad Jack's Cafe dining facilities. It also houses several ballrooms and conference rooms, a movie theater, Wilderness Pursuits, LEAD & Orientation offices, the Multicultural Center, and the Residence Life offices.

Residence halls 
Western has 10 on-campus residence halls. Five have traditional, two-person rooms, three are suite-style and two are apartments. All students are required to live on campus for their first two years.

ICELab 
The Innovation + Creativity + Entrepreneurship (ICE) Lab is one of the newest additions to Western's campus and partners with the Colorado Small Business Development Center. Although it occupies an older building on campus, the interior has been completely remodeled as collaborative and modular workspace to help promote economic development on the Western Slope of Colorado. The downstairs of the ICELab is now the Coffee Lab, a coffee shop that helps fund the Rocky Mountain Biological Laboratory.

Borick Business Building 
The Borick Business Building is home to the School of Business, which encompasses the Business Administration, Accounting and Economics programs in addition to the nation's first Outdoor Industry MBA.

Taylor Hall 
Taylor Hall was the first building on Western's campus. It is LEED-certified and houses Western's administrative offices as well as the Communication Arts, Languages & Literature Department, Welcome Center and WSB radio station.

Hurst Quad 

The Hurst Quad comprises Kelley, Hurst and Quigley Halls. Kelley Hall houses the Behavioral & Social Sciences and Environment & Sustainability departments. Hurst Hall houses the Natural & Environmental Sciences and Mathematics & Computer Science departments. Quigley Hall, which received significant renovations in 2016, is the center for the Art and Music departments.

Leslie J. Savage Library 
The Leslie J. Savage Library's West Wing was designed by Temple Buell.

Mountaineer Field House and Paul Wright Gym 
The Mountaineer Field House opened on Western's campus in March 2014. The 65,000-square-foot facility includes a 200-meter track, multi-purpose courts, workout rooms, climbing wall, and a trampoline and foam pit.

The Paul Wright Gym is attached to the Mountaineer Field House. At the north end of campus, this 1951 building is the world's highest collegiate gym. It seats 1,800 and various renovations have added Western's indoor pool, a wrestling room, locker rooms, the Hall of Fame trophy room and classrooms for Western's Recreation & Outdoor Education and Exercise & Sport Science departments. It's named for Paul W. Wright, who spent 38 years as a professor, coach and administrator at Western, as well serving as a judge and mayor of Gunnison.

Athletics

NCAA 

The Western Colorado University Mountaineers compete in the Rocky Mountain Athletic Conference (RMAC) at the NCAA Division II level. Mountaineer teams compete in 11 sports: football, women's volleyball, men's and women's cross country, men's and women's track & field (indoor and outdoor), women's soccer, men's and women's basketball, men's wrestling, and women's swimming & diving. Facilities include Mountaineer Bowl (elevation ) and Paul Wright Gym (elevation ).

The Mountaineers have won 93 RMAC team titles and 15 team National Championships. Individually, Western has produced 990 All-Americans and 30 Academic All-American honors.

In 2016–17, Alicja Konieczek became the first Mountaineer to win four national track and field titles. She has since won four more national titles—the most by any female in Western's history.

Mountain Sports 
Western Mountain Sports is an athletic program revolving around outdoor, mountain-based athletics. The program includes disciplines in freeride (big mountain) skiing and snowboarding, freestyle skiing and snowboarding, alpine ski racing, Nordic ski racing, randonnée (SkiMo) racing, mountain biking, rock climbing, road cycling and trail running. There is also a media program, where students travel with the teams and document the trips and events through a variety of visual and written media.

The program differs from NCAA athletics in that Mountain Sports athletes don't necessarily compete in intercollegiate competition and may carry sponsorships and accept prize money. While technically a club sport program, Mountain Sports distinguishes from club and intramural sports due to the abundance of funding for coaching, travel, equipment and overall popularity.

Three Freeride athletes have qualified for the Freeride World Tour.

Club and intramural sports 
Western's Club sports include: men's baseball, men's boxing, women's boxing, men's ice hockey, women's ice hockey, men's lacrosse, men's rugby, women's rugby, men's soccer, women's soccer and coed swimming.

Western's intramural sports are all coed and include: slow-pitch softball, flag football, ultimate frisbee, kickball, bubble ball soccer, indoor soccer, floor hockey, pickleball, inner-tube water polo, dodgeball, volleyball, basketball, table tennis/billiards and Quidditch.

Clubs and organizations

Wilderness Pursuits 

Wilderness Pursuits, commonly referred to as simply “WP," provides Western students and visitors affordable gear rentals and opportunities for outdoor expeditions. WP hires students to guide and instruct courses, and puts on “Wilderness Based Orientation” before the start of each academic year. The most popular trips include whitewater rafting, kayaking, mountain biking, ice climbing, rock climbing and backpacking.

Mountain Rescue Team 

The Western Mountain Rescue Team (WMRT) serves the Gunnison County region and is the only collegiate search-and-rescue team accredited by the Mountain Rescue Association (MRA). The team was first started in 1967 after a group of students banded together to search for a missing physics professor and has been MRA-certified since 1987.

Multicultural Center 

The Multicultural Center celebrates the diversity of people in and around the Gunnison community and helps students develop culturally, personally and academically. The Multicultural Center advises five student organizations: Amigos, Asian Pacific Islanders Club, Black Student Alliance, Native America Student Council, and Polynesian Chant and Dance.

KWSB Radio 

Western has one of the oldest collegiate radio stations in the state, student-operated KWSB 91.1 FM, which has been on the air since 1968.

Top o' the World Newspaper 

The Top has been in print since 1921 and is entirely written and produced by Western students, with funding from student fees and advertising.

Organics Guild 

Organics Guild is a student-led initiative that promotes sustainable food systems on campus and around Gunnison. The group maintains two gardens on campus. Students and community members can pick vegetables, which are often sold at the Gunnison Farmers Market.

Sources of Strength 
Western's Office of Student Health and Wellness implemented the nationally recognized Sources of Strength program in 2018. The program's mission is to provide evidence-based prevention for suicide, violence, bullying and substance abuse by training, supporting, and empowering peer leaders and adults to impact the campus through the power of connection, hope, help and strength. Western is the first university in Colorado and only the eighth in the nation to implement Sources of Strength.

Culture

In 1994, the school commissioned Santa Fe sculptors Gene and Rebecca Tobey to create a new work for the campus. The result was Pathfinder, a six-foot-tall bronze grizzly bear, which students have a custom of hugging for good luck during exams. Two other Tobey works are displayed at Western—a bronze bull elk titled Wind River, which stands out by the skate park, and a small buffalo titled Wandering Star which is displayed inside Leslie J. Savage Library.

Western Colorado Foundation
The Western Colorado University Foundation is a private nonprofit corporation founded in 1975. It is the primary depository of private gifts from alumni, friends, corporations and foundations used to advance the mission and goals of Western Colorado University. Each year, the Foundation gives more than $2 million to the university, with the greatest portion directed to scholarships.

Notable alumni
Robert E. Blackburn - Senior United States district judge of the United States District Court for the District of Colorado
Harry Butler, William Henry "Harry" Butler AO CBE, Eminent naturalist and conservationist,  media presenter In the Wild 1976–81, Australian of the Year 1979 
Shane Carwin - (environmental technology) wrestler; former mixed martial artist who won the UFC Interim Heavyweight Championship
Barry Clifford - Underwater archaeological explorer
Michael K. Davis - Chief justice of the Wyoming Supreme Court
Elva Dryer - Long-distance runner
Austin Ekeler - Running back for the Los Angeles Chargers
Jennifer Fielder - Montana State Senator
Dan Gibbs - Colorado legislator
Michael O. Johnson - Former CEO of Herbalife
Lauren Kleppin - Long-distance runner
Ila Mae McAfee - Artist
Rutherford George Montgomery - Children's book writer and Walt Disney Studios scriptwriter
Seth Morrison - Big mountain skier
Tyler Pennel - Long-distance runner
 Kristal Reisinger - former student, teacher, and missing person in nearby Crestone, and subject of the podcast Up and Vanished's second season
Sam Seale - NFL player
Barbara Szabo - High jump athlete
Josh Thompson - Biathlete, Winter Olympian, silver medalist at the 1987 Biathlon World Championships
Dave Wiens - Professional mountain biker

References

External links
Official website
Official athletics website

 
Liberal arts colleges in Colorado
Public universities and colleges in Colorado
Buildings and structures in Gunnison County, Colorado
Colorado Western Slope
Education in Gunnison County, Colorado
Educational institutions established in 1901
1901 establishments in Colorado
Tourist attractions in Gunnison County, Colorado